Bulaqotağı (also, Bulagotagi and Bulagotagy) is a village in the Agdash Rayon of Azerbaijan.

References 

Populated places in Agdash District